Tormod Knutsen "Tom" Mobraaten (19 February 1910 – 10 June 1991) was a Canadian skier, born in Kongsberg, Norway. He competed in ski jumping, cross-country skiing, and Nordic combined. He participated at the 1936 Winter Olympics in Garmisch-Partenkirchen, and at the 1948 Winter Olympics in St. Moritz.

References

1910 births
1991 deaths
People from Kongsberg
Norwegian emigrants to Canada
Canadian male ski jumpers
Canadian male cross-country skiers
Canadian male Nordic combined skiers
Olympic ski jumpers of Canada
Olympic cross-country skiers of Canada
Olympic Nordic combined skiers of Canada
Ski jumpers at the 1936 Winter Olympics
Cross-country skiers at the 1936 Winter Olympics
Nordic combined skiers at the 1936 Winter Olympics
Ski jumpers at the 1948 Winter Olympics